Lubyanskaya Square (Lubyanskaya ploshchad'), or simply Lubyanka in Moscow lies about  north-east of Red Square. History first records its name in 1480, when Grand Prince Ivan III of Moscow, who had conquered Novgorod in 1471, settled many Novgorodians in the area. They built the church of St Sophia, modelled after St Sophia Cathedral in Novgorod, and called the area Lubyanka after the Lubyanitsa street of their native city.

Name 
The square was renamed Dzerzhinsky Square for many years (1926–1990) in honor of  the founder of the Soviet security service Felix Dzerzhinsky.

Square center 
A fountain used to stand in front of the building, at the center of the Lubyanka Square. In 1958, the fountain at the center of the Lubyanka Square was replaced by an 11-ton statue of Felix Dzerzhinsky ("Iron Felix"), founder of the Cheka, made by Yevgeny Vuchetich.

On October 30, 1990, the Memorial organization erected the Solovetsky Stone, a monument to the victims of the Gulag, a simple stone from the Solovki prison camp in the White Sea. In 1991 the statue of Dzerzhinsky was removed by liberal protesters following the failure of the coup attempt against Mikhail Gorbachev, and the square's original name was officially restored.

Lubyanka Building 
Originally built for the insurance company Rossiya, it later became better known for housing the headquarters of the KGB in its various incarnations.  the Federal Security Service of the Russian Federation (FSB) occupies the building.

Detsky Mir 
Opposite the FSB building stands the massive Central Children's Store, known by its historical name of Detsky Mir ("Children World"), Europe's largest children's store, built between 1953 and 1957, and fully restored in 2014. It hosts in its main atrium the world's largest mechanical clock movement: Raketa Monumental.

Metro 
The Moscow Metro station Lubyanka operates under Lubyanka Square.

Gallery

References

External links 

Squares in Moscow